Lebowa was a bantustan ("homeland") located in the Transvaal in northeastern South Africa.  Seshego initially acted as Lebowa's capital while the purpose-built Lebowakgomo was being constructed.  Granted internal self-government on 2 October 1972 and ruled for much of its existence by Cedric Phatudi, Lebowa was reincorporated into South Africa in 1994. It became part of the Limpopo province. The territory was not contiguous, being divided into two major and several minor portions.

Even though Lebowa included large swathes of Sekukuniland and was seen as a home for the Northern Sotho speaking ethnic groups such as the Pedi people, it was also home to various non-Northern Sotho speaking tribes, including the Northern Ndebele, Batswana and VaTsonga.

Etymology
The name "Lebowa" is an archaic spelling of the Northern Sotho word "leboa" which means "north". The name was chosen as a compromise between the various Northern Sotho groups for which it was designed.

History
The North Sotho National Unit was founded on 1 June 1960 in pursuance of separate development. It was created to be a homeland for Northern Sotho peoples such as Bapedi, Batlokwa, Babirwa, Banareng, Bahananwa, Balobedu, Bakone, Baroka, Bakgakga, Bahlaloga, Batau, Bakwena, Baphuthi, Batlou and many others. On 2 October 1972 it was granted internal self-governance and renamed Lebowa. Beginning in the 1950s through to the 1970s, thousands of people were forcibly removed from their communities and relocated to Lebowa.

The first black leader of the territory was Mokgoma Maurice Matlala who was handpicked by the apartheid authorities. He first led the North Sotho National Unit as its Executive Chief Councillor from August 1969 to 2 October 1972 at which point he became the Executive Chief Minister of Lebowa. The following year of 1973 on 3 May Mokgoma's Lebowa National Party lost the first elections of the homeland to the Lebowa People's Party and Dr. Cedric Phatudi took over. He went on to win two more re-elections in 1978 and 1973 but died in his third term in 1987. ZT Seleka was announced as the interim leader of the homeland. After elections, Mogoboya Nelson Ramodike became the Executive Chief Minister until 1989 when the office became the Prime Ministry.

On 24 April 1994 Nelson Ramodike resigned and the homeland had no active administration until 27 April when it was reintegrated into South Africa.

The overwhelming majority of its territory became part of the newly formed province of the Northern Transvaal (now Limpopo) and a smaller portion formed the newly created Eastern Transvaal province (now Mpumalanga).

Institutions of Higher Education
University of the North

Districts in 1991
Districts of the province and population at the 1991 census. 
 Namakgale: 55,441 (LEB-13)
 Bolobedu: 196,669 (LEB-7)
 Sekgosese: 124,425 (LEB-10)
 Bochum: 149,869 (LEB-11)
 Mokerong: 446,155 (LEB-3)
 Seshego: 302,676 (LEB-4)
 Thabamoopo: 353,193 (LEB-1)
 Nebo: 324,909 (LEB-5)
 Sekhukhuneland: 404,335 (LEB-2)
 Naphuno: 167,665 (LEB-8)
 Mapulaneng: 215,250 (LEB-12)
 Botlokwa (LEB-10)
 Moutse District (LEB-9?)
 GASELEKA (LEB-3)
 PRAKTISEER (LEB-6)

Moutse district was seized from Lebowa in 1980 and was, despite violent resistance, officially integrated into KwaNdebele.

See also
Chief Ministers of Lebowa
Sekukuniland

References 

 
1994 disestablishments in South Africa
Bantustans in South Africa
States and territories established in 1972
Former enclaves
1972 establishments in South Africa
States and territories disestablished in 1994